Nematabad-e Dokhtoran (also Romanized as Ne‘matābād-e Dokhtorān; also known as Ne‘matābād and Ne‘matābād-e Farrokh) is a village in Zeydabad Rural District, in the Central District of Sirjan County, Kerman Province, Iran. At the 2006 census, its population was 98, in 27 families.

References 

Populated places in Sirjan County